This is a list of schools in Rhondda Cynon Taf in Wales.

Primary schools

Abercynon Community Primary School 
Aberdare Park Primary School
Aberdare Town CW Primary School	
Aberllechau Primary School	
Abernant County Primary School	
Alaw Primary School
Blaengwawr Primary School
Bodringallt Primary School
Brynnau Primary School
Caegarw Primary School
Capcoch Primary School
Caradog Primary School	
Cefn Primary School	
Cilfynydd Primary School	
Coedpenmaen County Primary School		
Craig Yr Hesg Primary School	
Cwmaman Infants School	
Cwmbach CW Primary School	
Cwmbach Primary School 	
Cwmclydach Primary School	
Cwmdar County Primary School	
Cwmlai Primary School	
Cymmer Infant School	
Cymmer Junior School
Darrenlas Primary School
Dolau Primary School 
Ferndale Infants School	
Ffynnon Taf Primary School
Gelli Primary School	
Glanffrwd Infants School	
Glantaf Infants School	
Glenboi Community Primary School
Glynhafod Junior School
Gwauncelyn Primary School
Hawthorn Primary School	
Hendreforgan Community Primary School		
Heol Y Celyn Primary School 
Hirwaun Primary School	
Llanharan Primary School	
Llanhari Primary School	
Llanilltud Faerdref Primary School	
Llantrisant Primary School	
Llwydcoed Primary School	
Llwyncelyn Infants School	
Llwyncrwn Primary School	
Llwynypia Primary School	
Maerdy Community Primary School	
Maesybryn Primary School	
Maesycoed Primary School	
Miskin Primary School	
Oaklands Primary School	
Our Lady's RC Primary School	
Parc Lewis Primary School	
Parc Primary School	
Penderyn Primary School 
Pengeulan Primary School	
Penpych Primary School	view
Penrhiwceiber Primary School	
Penrhys Primary School	
Pentre Primary School	
Penygawsi Primary School	
Penygraig Infants School	
Penygraig Junior School	
Penyrenglyn Community Primary School	
Penywaun Primary School
Perthcelyn Community Primary School
Pontrhondda Primary School	
Pontyclun Primary School	
Pontygwaith Primary School	
Porth Infants School	
Porth Junior School
Rhigos Primary School			
Rhiwgarn Infants School
SS Gabriel & Raphael RC Primary School
St Margaret's RC Primary School
St Michael's RC Primary School
Ton Pentre Infants School	
Ton Pentre Junior School	
Tonypandy Primary School	
Tonyrefail Primary School	
Tonysguboriau Primary School	
Trallwng Infants School	
Trealaw Primary School	
Tref y rhyg Primary School	
Trehopcyn Primary School
Treorchy Primary School	
Trerobart Primary School	
Tylorstown Primary School	
Williamstown Primary School	
Ynysboeth Community Primary School	
Ynysboeth Primary School	
Ynyshir Primary School	
Ynyswen Infants School
Ysgol Yr Eos

Welsh medium primary schools 

Ysgol Gynradd Gymraeg Abercynon	
Ysgol Gynradd Gymraeg Aberdar	
Ysgol Gynradd Gymraeg Bodringallt	
Ysgol Gynradd Gymraeg Bronllwyn
Ysgol Gynradd Gymraeg Castellau
Ysgol Dolau (dual stream) 
Ysgol Gynradd Gymraeg Evan James
Ysgol Gynradd Gymraeg Garth Olwg
Ysgol Llanhari
Ysgol Gynradd Gymraeg Llwyncelyn
Ysgol Gynradd Gymraeg Llyn-y-Forwyn
Ysgol Gynradd Gymraeg Pont Sion Norton
Ysgol Gynradd Gymraeg Tonyrefail
Ysgol Gynradd Gymraeg Ynyswen
Ysgol Gynradd Gymunedol Gymraeg Llantrisant

Secondary schools

Aberdare High School 
Aberdare Girls' School
Blaengwawr Comprehensive School
Bryn Celynnog Comprehensive School
Cardinal Newman RC School 
Ferndale Community School 
Hawthorn High School 
Mountain Ash Comprehensive School 
Pontypridd High School
Porth County Comprehensive School
St. John the Baptist School
Tonypandy Comprehensive School
Tonyrefail School
Treorchy Comprehensive School 
Y Pant School

Welsh medium secondary schools 
Ysgol Gyfun Cymer Rhondda
Ysgol Gyfun Llanhari
Ysgol Gyfun Garth Olwg 
Ysgol Gyfun Rhydywaun

Special schools
Maesgwyn Special School
Park Lane Special School
Ysgol Hen Felin
Ysgol Ty Coch

Further and higher education establishments
Coleg Y Cymoedd
University of South Wales

 
Rhondda Cynon Taf